KHCE-TV (channel 23) is a religious television station in San Antonio, Texas, United States, airing programming from the Trinity Broadcasting Network (TBN). It is owned and operated by TBN's Community Educational Television subsidiary, which manages stations in Texas and Florida on channels allocated for non-commercial educational broadcasting. KHCE-TV's studios are located on Capital Port Drive in northwest San Antonio, and its transmitter is located off Route 181 in northwest Wilson County (northeast of Elmendorf).

Background
The station first signed on the air on July 9, 1989; it was one of the first stations to be built and signed on the air by TBN subsidiary Community Educational Television. KHCE's programming was also previously simulcast on a low-power translator station, K20BW in San Antonio; this translator ceased operations in 2010, and has since been sold to Digital Networks - Southwest, LLC.

KHCE produces four local programs seen on the air: a local version of TBN's local public affairs franchise Joy in Our Town, the biblical studies program Up with the Son, the educational program We Speak Inglés y Español and a local edition of Praise the Lord. In addition to programming from TBN, the station airs educational programming to prepare local students for the General Educational Development (GED) test to fulfill the requirements under their license service.

Subchannels

References

External links 
 
KHCE-TV information on TBN's website

Trinity Broadcasting Network affiliates
Television channels and stations established in 1989
1989 establishments in Texas
Television stations in San Antonio